Geolycosa is a genus of wolf spiders first described in 1904.

Species
, it contains 75 species:

Geolycosa aballicola (Strand, 1906)
Geolycosa albimarginata (Badcock, 1932)
Geolycosa appetens Roewer, 1960
Geolycosa ashantica (Strand, 1916)
Geolycosa atroscopulata Roewer, 1955
Geolycosa atrosellata Roewer, 1960
Geolycosa bridarollii (Mello-Leitão, 1945)
Geolycosa buyebalana Roewer, 1960
Geolycosa carli (Reimoser, 1934)
Geolycosa charitonovi (Mcheidze, 1997)
Geolycosa conspersa (Thorell, 1877)
Geolycosa cyrenaica (Simon, 1908)
Geolycosa diffusa Roewer, 1960
Geolycosa disposita Roewer, 1960
Geolycosa diversa Roewer, 1960
Geolycosa domifex (Hancock, 1899)
Geolycosa dunini Zyuzin & Logunov, 2000
Geolycosa egena (L. Koch, 1877)
Geolycosa escambiensis Wallace, 1942
Geolycosa excussa (Tullgren, 1905)
Geolycosa fatifera (Hentz, 1842)
Geolycosa festina (L. Koch, 1877)
Geolycosa flavichelis Roewer, 1955
Geolycosa forsaythi (Dahl, 1908)
Geolycosa gaerdesi Roewer, 1960
Geolycosa gofensis (Strand, 1906)
Geolycosa gosoga (Chamberlin, 1925)
Geolycosa habilis Roewer, 1960
Geolycosa hectoria (Pocock, 1900)
Geolycosa hubbelli Wallace, 1942
Geolycosa hyltonscottae (Mello-Leitão, 1941)
Geolycosa impudica (Mello-Leitão, 1944)
Geolycosa incertula (Mello-Leitão, 1941)
Geolycosa infensa (L. Koch, 1877)
Geolycosa insulata (Mello-Leitão, 1944)
Geolycosa ituricola (Strand, 1913)
Geolycosa katekeana Roewer, 1960
Geolycosa kijabica (Strand, 1916)
Geolycosa lancearia (Mello-Leitão, 1940)
Geolycosa latifrons Montgomery, 1904
Geolycosa liberiana Roewer, 1960
Geolycosa lindneri (Karsch, 1879)
Geolycosa lusingana (Roewer, 1959)
Geolycosa micanopy Wallace, 1942
Geolycosa minor (Simon, 1910)
Geolycosa missouriensis (Banks, 1895)
Geolycosa natalensis Roewer, 1960
Geolycosa nolotthensis (Simon, 1910)
Geolycosa nossibeensis (Strand, 1907)
Geolycosa ornatipes (Bryant, 1935)
Geolycosa patellonigra Wallace, 1942
Geolycosa pikei (Marx, 1881)
Geolycosa rafaelana (Chamberlin, 1928)
Geolycosa raptatorides (Strand, 1909)
Geolycosa riograndae Wallace, 1942
Geolycosa rogersi Wallace, 1942
Geolycosa rubrotaeniata (Keyserling, 1877)
Geolycosa rufibarbis (Mello-Leitão, 1947)
Geolycosa sangilia (Roewer, 1955)
Geolycosa schulzi (Dahl, 1908)
Geolycosa sexmaculata Roewer, 1960
Geolycosa shinkuluna Roewer, 1960
Geolycosa suahela (Strand, 1913)
Geolycosa subvittata (Pocock, 1900)
Geolycosa tangana (Roewer, 1959)
Geolycosa ternetzi (Mello-Leitão, 1939)
Geolycosa timorensis (Thorell, 1881)
Geolycosa togonia Roewer, 1960
Geolycosa turricola (Treat, 1880)
Geolycosa uinticolens (Chamberlin, 1936)
Geolycosa uruguayaca (Strand, 1909)
Geolycosa vultuosa (C. L. Koch, 1838)
Geolycosa wrighti (Emerton, 1912)
Geolycosa xera McCrone, 1963
Geolycosa xera archboldi McCrone, 1963

References

Lycosidae
Araneomorphae genera
Cosmopolitan spiders